Bob Sweeney (October 19, 1918 – June 7, 1992) was an American actor, director and producer of radio, television and film.

Early years
Bob Sweeney was a graduate of Balboa High School in San Francisco  and San Francisco State College. In the early part of World War II, he and college classmate George Fenneman formed a stand-up comedy team and entertained troops at military bases.

Early career on radio and television
Sweeney began his career on radio as an announcer and then became a comedian. From 1944 through 1948 he teamed with comedy partner Hal March in The Bob Sweeney-Hal March Show on CBS Radio. He went on to appear as a supporting character in various sitcoms in the early days of television including the role of Gilmore Cobb in the television version of My Favorite Husband (1953–54) with co-stars Joan Caulfield and Barry Nelson. Sweeney made appearances on The Rifleman and Our Miss Brooks during its last two seasons of production (1955–1956) working alongside Eve Arden, Gale Gordon, and Richard Crenna.

From 1956 to 1957, Sweeney starred with Gordon in the TV sitcom The Brothers. In 1959, he landed the lead role on the short-lived NBC television series Fibber McGee and Molly opposite Cathy Lewis. Unlike its radio counterpart, Fibber McGee failed on television and was cancelled after less than one season. During that same season, Sweeney directed the 18-week NBC sitcom Love and Marriage set in Tin Pan Alley of New York City. His co-stars were William Demarest, Stubby Kaye, Jeanne Bal, and Murray Hamilton.

Movie roles
Sweeney's most notable film credits as an actor include the role of the undertaker in John Ford's The Last Hurrah (1958), as manipulative circus manager Harry Tupper in the Disney film Toby Tyler (1960), and as smarmy advertising executive Mr. Harker in another Disney film, Son of Flubber (1963). Sweeney also appeared as Cousin Bob in Alfred Hitchcock's Marnie (1964).

Directing and producing
Sweeney is best known for his successes as a television director and producer, most notably as the director of 102 episodes of The Andy Griffith Show and as producer and/or director of episodes of several other highly successful TV series including That Girl,  Hawaii Five-O, The Love Boat, Matlock, Hogan's Heroes, and Dynasty. He also directed Gene Evans's unsuccessful 1976 CBS adventure series, Spencer's Pilots. He also directed Accidental Family. Sweeney was nominated for an Emmy Award three times, twice for Hawaii Five-O (1971 and 1973) and once for The Love Boat (1983).

Personal details
Sweeney and his wife, Bev, had one child, a daughter, Bridget.

Death
Sweeney died of cancer in Westlake Village, California, on June 7, 1992.

Filmography

References

External links

Biography by Yahoo
The Sweeney & March Show  by The Radio Gold Index
Biography by The New York Times

1918 births
1992 deaths
American male radio actors
Television producers from California
American television directors
American male film actors
Deaths from cancer in California
20th-century American male actors
Male actors from San Francisco
San Francisco State University alumni
20th-century American businesspeople
People from Westlake Village, California